Kevin D. Breault is an American sociologist and Professor of Sociology at Middle Tennessee State University, who researches in the areas of social epidemiology, suicide, homicide, religion in America, and Émile Durkheim. He serves as Editor-in-Chief of Sociological Spectrum.

Biography 
Breault earned his secondary school diploma at Woodstock Country School, South Woodstock, Vermont, his B.A. degree from Reed College, his M.A. from the University of Washington, and in 1986 his Ph.D. degree at the University of Chicago.

Breault began his academic career at the University of Cincinnati as Assistant Professor of Sociology (1985–1987), Fellow at the Center for Advanced Study in the Behavior Sciences, Stanford University (1987), Ogburn-Stouffer Fellow at the University of Chicago (1987–1988). He was then appointed Assistant Professor of Sociology and Psychiatry at Washington University in St. Louis (1988–1991). After the sociology program at Washington University was closed, he worked as a Visiting Assistant Professor of Sociology at University of Illinois at Chicago, Assistant Professor of Sociology at Austin Peay State University (1992–1994), Associate Professor of Sociology at Austin Peay (1994–1998), Sociology Chair at Austin Peay State University (1997–1998). He was appointed Associate Professor of Sociology at Middle Tennessee State University in 1999, and promoted in 2001 to Professor.

He served as Co-Editor-in-Chief of Sociological Spectrum (2011–2013), and since 2014 serves as the journal's Editor-in-Chief. He has served as President of the Mid-South Sociological Association (2016-2017).

He has independently published a young adult novel entitled With Wings to Fly, Bloomington, IN, 1st Books, 1999, and is a noted birder and has a top 5 ranking in the American Birding Association on the "Total Ticks" list.

Work 
Breault has 48 publications in the general areas of medical-social epidemiology, crime, and quantitative methodology on such topics as depression and military service, diabetes, history of the Mid-South Sociological Association, immigration, drug use, property crime, religious diversity in America, divorce, psychophysical measurement, and the measurement of marginal utility.

Breault's research has focused on helping to establish the legitimacy of empirical research on Durkheim's theory of suicide, and moving the literature beyond the study of small sample ecological units of analysis to individual level longitudinal study where he has published on depression in the military, diabetes and suicide, now commonly thought of as Social Epidemiology.

In May 2021, Breault co-authored a paper with a group that analyzed diabetes deaths that were less complicated by atherosclerotic and hypertensive cardiovascular disease in a sample of 1.4 million people. Divorced or separated men had high risk for diabetes mortality presumably because without a spouse they tended to overeat leading to obesity and related morbidity. While most women do quite well in widowed status because they have increased social integration with other seniors especially women, this was not the case with regard to diabetes. The social integration that prevents many widowed women from other forms of morbidity and mortality, also seems to contribute to high risk for diabetes mortality because overeating in women is associated with increased social integration.

In August 2021, co-authored a paper on depression in the military, In this sample individual level longitudinal study, involving multilevel growth modeling, the authors show that those in the military had the same level of depression as civilians. Given the difficult situations military members experience, these results may indicate military service is strongly related to resilience from depression.

In a paper published in November 2019 focused on unemployment, the group showed that despite previous findings and gender assumptions unemployed women in the U.S. have higher deaths from suicide than unemployed men. This is the first time that women have been seen as having higher suicide risks compared to men on any variable previously studied. Discussion focused on explanations for gender disparities in unemployment including gender discrimination and harassment.

In the 2020 suicide paper focused on Émile Durkheim's theory, the research group showed that in the most recent individual level longitudinal data, the divorced and separated were more than 88% more likely to suicide than the married. In the discussion section it was noted that Durkheim's marital status propositions are less important to his theory than the amount of social integration, attachments, interactions and social control, much of which can be found at the social psychological level despite Durkheim's sociological imperialism.

Selected publications

Highly cited publications 
1995: "Reassessing the Structural Covariates of Violent and Property Crime: A County Level Study," (with A. J. Kposowa & B. Harrison), British Journal of Sociology, 46, 79-105. According to Google Scholar, this article has been cited 221 times.
1995: "White Male Suicide in the United States: A Multivariate Individual Level Analysis," (with A.J. Kposowa and G. Singh), Social Forces, 1995, 74, 315-325. According to google Scholar, this article has been cited 106 times.
1993: "Reassessing the Structural Covariates of U.S. Homicide Rates: A County Level Study," (with A.J. Kposowa) Sociological Focus, 1993, 26, 27-46. According to Google Scholar, this article has been cited 87 times.
1989: “New Evidence on Religious Pluralism, Urbanism and Religious Participation,” American Sociological Review, 1989, 54, 1048-53. According to Google Scholar, this article has been cited 187 times.
1987: “Explaining Divorce in the United States,” (with A.J. Kposowa), Journal of Marriage and the Family, 1987, 49, 549-58. According to Google Scholar, this article has been cited 105 times.
1986: "Suicide in America: A Test of Durkheim’s Theory of Religious and Family Integration, 1933-1980,” American Journal of Sociology, 628-56. According to Google Scholar, it has been cited 302 times.

 1982: “A Comparative Analysis of Durkheim’s Theory of Egoistic Suicide” (with K. Barkey), Sociological Quarterly, 1982, 23, 321-31. According to Google Scholar, this article has been cited 101 times.

Most recent publications 
2021: "Resilience and Depression in Military Service: Evidence from the National Longitudinal Study of Adolescent to Adult Health (Add Health)," (with U. Orak, A Kayaalp, and M. Walker) Military Medicine, 2021.
2021: "Diabetes Mellitus and Marital Status: Evidence from the National Longitudinal Mortality Study on the Effect of Marital Dissolution and the Death of a Spouse," (with A.J. Kposowa and D.A. Ezzat) International Journal of General Medicine, 2021, 14, 1881-1888.
2021: "European Demographic Risks, Immigration, Aging, and Social Recession," (with A.J. Kposowa). In R. Verdugo (ed.), The Demographic Crisis in Europe, Charlottle: Information Age Publishing.
2020: "A History of the Mid-South Sociological Association," (with Marc Matre) Sociological Spectrum, 329-361.
2019: "New Findings on Gender: The Effects of Employment Status on Suicide," (with A.J. Kposowa and D.A. Ezzat) International Journal of Women's Health,11, 569-575.

References 

American sociologists
Living people
Year of birth missing (living people)
Austin Peay State University faculty
Middle Tennessee State University faculty
Reed College alumni
Stanford University fellows
University of Chicago alumni
University of Chicago fellows
University of Cincinnati faculty
University of Illinois Chicago faculty
University of Washington alumni
Washington University in St. Louis faculty